Manuela Bosco (born 11 June 1982) is a Finnish actress and former hurdler.

Biography
Manuela Bosco, despite having dual citizenship (Italian and Finnish), chose to compete for Finland, She is the niece of the Finnish cross-country skier Harri Kirvesniemi.

In 2012, she debuted as an actress in the Finnish short movie Hankikanto, and in 2013, in the TV series Nymphs.

Bosco has two children with actor Kasimir Baltzar. She married musician Tuure Kilpeläinen in June 2018. They have a daughter born in February 2019.

Achievements

Filmography

Film

Television

Music video

See also
 Finland at the 2000 Summer Olympics

References

External links
 
 
 

1982 births
Living people
People from Mikkeli
Finnish people of Italian descent
21st-century Finnish actresses
Finnish female hurdlers
Olympic athletes of Finland
Athletes (track and field) at the 2000 Summer Olympics
Finnish television actresses